Frank Barna Bigelow (7 February 1869 – 30 May 1949) was an American librarian. 

He was born at Amherst, Mass., Feb. 7, 1869; son of Orvis F. and Mary Helen (Pingry) Bigelow, and grandson of Judge William Morrill Pingry of Vermont. He was educated at the schools of Amherst, and was graduated from Amherst College in 1891. 

In February 1892, he was appointed assistant librarian at the Columbia College library, and in May 1895, transferred his services to the New York Society Library, to succeed Wentworth S. Butler as head librarian. He held that post until 1937, after which he was made librarian emeritus.

References

American librarians
1869 births
1949 deaths
Amherst College alumni
People from Amherst, Massachusetts
Columbia University staff